Our Secret World is Kurt Rosenwinkel's ninth album as a band leader. It is a collaboration with the Orchestra de Jazz Matosinhos from Portugal. The project was begun in 2007 and was performed in 2008. Recording took place over three days in September 2009. This was preceded by three days of twelve-hour rehearsals.

All of the selections are by Rosenwinkel and have been a part of his songbook since the 1990s. "Dream of the Old" appeared on The Enemies of Energy. "Path of the Heart", "Zhivago", and "Use of Light"  appeared on The Next Step. "Our Secret World" was on  Heartcore. "The Cloister" was on Deep Song. "Turns", though an old composition, debuts on this album.

Track listing
All songs by Kurt Rosenwinkel

 "Our Secret World"  – 6:34
 "The Cloister"  – 9:18
 "Zhivago" – 8:45
 "Dream of the Old"  – 11:34
 "Turns" – 6:38
 "Use of Light"  – 10:10
 "Path of the Heart"  – 13:08

Personnel
 Kurt Rosenwinkel – guitar, vocals
 Jose Luis Rego – alto and soprano saxophones, clarinet
 Joao Pedro Brandao – alto and soprano saxophones, clarinet, flute
 Joao Mortagua – alto and soprano saxophones
 Nuno Pinto – clarinet
 Mario Santos – tenor saxophone, clarinet
 Jose Pedro Coelho – tenor saxophone, flute
 Rui Teixeira – baritone saxophone, bass clarinet
 Nick Marchione – trumpet
 Erick Poirrier – trumpet
 Susana Santos Silva – trumpet, flugelhorn
 Rogerio Ribeiro – trumpet
 Jose Silva – trumpet
 Michael Joussein – trombone
 Alvaro Pinto – trombone
 Daniel Dias – trombone
 Goncalo Dias – trombone
 Abe Rabade – piano
 Carlos Azevedo – piano, arranger, conductor
 Demian Cabaud – double bass
 Marcos Cavaleiro – drums
 Ohad Talmor – arranger
 Pedro Guedes – arranger and conductor

References

2010 albums
Kurt Rosenwinkel albums